El Alto Municipality or El Alto de La Paz Municipality is a municipal section of the Pedro Domingo Murillo Province in the La Paz Department, Bolivia. Its seat is El Alto, the second-largest city in Bolivia.

See also 
 Janq'u Quta
 Laram Quta
 Milluni Lake
 Phaq'u Quta

References 
 www.ine.gov.bo / census 2001: El Alto Municipality

External links 
 Map of the Pedro Domingo Murillo Province

Municipalities of La Paz Department (Bolivia)